Jan Bauch (November 16, 1898 in Prague – January 9, 1995) was a versatile Czech artist, especially as a painter and sculptor.

He graduated from the School of Applied Arts and at the Academy of Fine Arts in 1924 (studied under Max Švabinský). He devoted himself to painting, drawing, illustration, printmaking, sculpture, and worked on the windows in St. Vitus Cathedral.

His paintings were painted strongly in the Czech Baroque style, with excitement and rhythm using brush strokes and layering, with dramatic contrasts and although colorful did not reflect optimism. Rather, tragedy and bitterness.

See also
List of Czech painters

References

1898 births
1995 deaths
Artists from Prague
Academy of Fine Arts, Prague alumni
20th-century Czech painters
20th-century Czech male artists
Czech male painters